Lime Creek is an unincorporated community in Belfast Township, Murray County, Minnesota, United States.  It is located two miles northeast of Fulda.

History
A post office was established at Lime Creek in 1889, and remained in operation until it was discontinued in 1971. The community took its name from nearby Lime Creek.

References

Unincorporated communities in Murray County, Minnesota
Unincorporated communities in Minnesota